Edward McGlynn (27 August 1931 – 24 April 2012) was an Australian sprinter. He competed in the men's 4 × 100 metres relay at the 1956 Summer Olympics.

References

1931 births
2012 deaths
Athletes (track and field) at the 1956 Summer Olympics
Australian male sprinters
Olympic athletes of Australia
Place of birth missing